Boris Beljak (26 August 1930 – 5 January 2013) was a Croatian rower. He competed in the men's eight event at the 1952 Summer Olympics.

References

1930 births
2013 deaths
Croatian male rowers
Olympic rowers of Yugoslavia
Rowers at the 1952 Summer Olympics
Sportspeople from Zagreb